The Union of Concerned Scientists (UCS) is a nonprofit science advocacy organization based in the United States. The UCS membership includes many private citizens in addition to professional scientists. Anne Kapuscinski, Professor of Environmental Studies and Director of The Coastal Science and Policy Program at the University of California—Santa Cruz, currently chairs the UCS Board of Directors, having replaced James J. McCarthy, Professor of Biological Oceanography at Harvard University and past president of the American Association for the Advancement of Science in 2015.

History
The Union of Concerned Scientists was founded in 1969 by faculty and students of the Massachusetts Institute of Technology. The organization's founding document says it was formed to "initiate a critical and continuing examination of governmental policy in areas where science and technology are of actual or potential significance" and to "devise means for turning research applications away from the present emphasis on military technology toward the solution of pressing environmental and social problems." The organization employs scientists, economists, and engineers engaged in environmental and security issues, as well as executive and support staff.

One of the co-founders was physicist and Nobel laureate Henry Kendall, who served for many years as chairman of the board of UCS.

In 1992, Kendall presided over the UCS-sponsored World Scientists' Warning to Humanity, which called for "fundamental change" to address a range of security and environmental issues. The document was signed by 1700 scientists, including a majority of the Nobel prize winners in the sciences.

According to the George C. Marshall Institute, the UCS was the fourth-largest recipient of foundation grants for "climate-related activities" in the period 2000–2002, a fourth of its $24M grant income being for that purpose. Charity Navigator – an independent non-profit organization that evaluates American charities – gave the UCS a four out of four star rating in the fiscal year ending in September of 2018, with an overall score of 91.85 out of 100. According to the organization's IRS Form 990, the UCS received $39.9 million in total revenue and had $3.1 million in expenses and $48.8 million in net assets for the tax year beginning October 1, 2017, and ending September 30, 2018.

Issue stances
UCS has been critical of proposed Generation III reactor designs. Edwin Lyman, a senior staff scientist at UCS, has challenged specific cost-saving design choices made for both the AP1000 and Economic Simplified Boiling Water Reactor. The UCS referred to the European Pressurized Reactor as the only new reactor design under consideration in the United States that "...appears to have the potential to be significantly safer and more secure against attack than today's reactors."

The UCS has also endorsed the Forests Now Declaration, which calls for new market based mechanism to protect forests, as the group has recognised the importance of curbing deforestation to tackle climate change. The group also supports governmental incentives for people who want to preserve undeveloped land instead of selling it to developers, as well as deforestation-free palm oil.

The UCS supports the reduction of antibiotic use on livestock to prevent medical antibiotic resistance, and also opposes cloning animals for food, as well as the industrial organization around genetically modified food, though they are open to the idea of (appropriately managed) GM food. They also oppose the use of space weapons, and work on reducing the number of nuclear weapons around the world.

Media coverage

In 1997, the UCS presented their "World Scientists Call For Action" petition to world leaders meeting to negotiate the Kyoto Protocol. The declaration asserted, "A broad consensus among the world's climatologists is that there is now 'a discernible human influence on global climate.'" It urged governments to make "legally binding commitments to reduce industrial nations' emissions of heat-trapping gases", and called global warming "one of the most serious threats to the planet and to future generations." The petition was signed by "more than 1,500 of the world's most distinguished senior scientists, including the majority of Nobel laureates in science." When a counter-petition from a conservative think-tank that questioned the consensus was signed by more than 17,000 science graduates, UCS declared it a "deliberate attempt to deceive the scientific community with misinformation."

In February 2004, the UCS received press attention for its publication "Scientific Integrity in Policymaking". The report criticized the administration of U.S. President George W. Bush for "politicizing" science. Some of the allegations include altering information in global warming reports by the Environmental Protection Agency (EPA), and choosing members of scientific advisory panels based on their business interests rather than scientific experience. In July 2004, the UCS released an addendum to the report in which they criticize the Bush administration and allege that reports on West Virginia strip mining had been improperly altered, and that "well-qualified" nominees for government posts such as Nobel laureate Torsten Wiesel were rejected because of political differences.  On April 2, 2004, John Marburger, the director of the White House Office of Science and Technology Policy, issued a statement claiming that incident descriptions in the UCS report are "false", "wrong", or "a distortion", and dismissed the report as "biased". UCS rebutted the White House document by saying that Marburger's claims were unjustified. UCS later wrote that since that time, the Bush administration has been virtually silent on the issue.

On October 30, 2006, the UCS issued a press release claiming that high-ranking members of the U.S. Department of the Interior, including Deputy Assistant Secretary for Fish and Wildlife and Parks Julie MacDonald, systematically tampered with scientific data in an effort to undermine the protection of endangered species and the Endangered Species Act.

On December 11, 2006, the UCS issued a statement calling for the restoration of scientific integrity to federal policy-making, which was signed by 10,600 leading scientists including Nobel laureates.

On May 23, 2007, the UCS cited a joint-study with MIT and issued a press release claiming that "any test of the U.S. missile defense system that does not show whether an interceptor missile can distinguish between real warheads and decoys is irrelevant" and "contrived," and called for an end to the taxpayer-funded program until the system can show an ability to actually address "real world threats."

On June 21, 2007, a UCS report charged the EPA with political manipulation of scientific data to influence updated US ozone regulations: "The law says use the science, the science says lower the standard to safe levels," said Francesca Grifo, director of the UCS' Scientific Integrity Program. "In disregarding its own scientists' analysis, the EPA is risking the health of millions of Americans."

In August 2008, the UCS purchased billboards at the airports in Denver, Colorado, and Minneapolis-St. Paul, Minnesota, where the Democratic and Republican presidential conventions were to be held. The two nearly identical billboards showed the downtown areas of each convention city in a cross hairs, with the message that "when only one nuclear bomb could destroy a city" like Minneapolis or Denver, "we don't need 6,000." The name of Senator John McCain or Senator Barack Obama follows, with this admonition: "It's time to get serious about reducing the nuclear threat." The billboards were removed after a complaint from Northwest Airlines, the official airline of the Republican convention. The UCS has accused Northwest, whose headquarters were in Minnesota, of "taking on a new role as censor" and of having acted because it regarded the Minneapolis advertisement as "scary" and "anti-McCain."

In March 2011, the UCS held daily telephone media briefings related to the Fukushima nuclear accident.

In June 2020, a UCS staffer named Ruth Tyson resigned and sent a 17-page open letter expressing her opinions on racial inequality in the organization, saying that ideas of black workers were routinely dismissed or given low priority. After reading the letter, UCS president Kim Kimmell responded by saying the criticism was fair, and that he believed it was reflective of a wider culture of white supremacy in society, vowing to address issues and diversify the UCS workforce.
His successor, Johanna Chao Kreilick, was chosen in part for "her track record of integrating racial justice into the work and culture of complex organizations".

References

External links

 
 
 
 Sustainable Energy Coalition

Scientific organizations based in the United States
Science advocacy organizations
Political advocacy groups in the United States
International Campaign to Abolish Nuclear Weapons
Nuclear weapons policy
Climate change organizations based in the United States
Renewable energy organizations based in the United States
Genetic engineering in the United States
Organizations based in Cambridge, Massachusetts
Scientific organizations established in 1969
1969 establishments in Massachusetts